Not So Silent Night is the eleventh studio album by German singer Sarah Connor. It was released on 18 November 2022 by Polydor Records. Her second Christmas album after Christmas in My Heart (2005) and a follow-up to Herz Kraft Werke (2019), it marks Connor's first English language album since Real Love (2010). Not So Silent Night was preceded by the single "Ring Out the Bells."

Promotion
On 13 November 2021, Connor released a new recording of "The Christmas Song" and its music video as an Amazon Music original. This song, alongside "Don't You Know That It's Christmas", is included as a bonus track on the deluxe edition of the album. Connor had previously recorded and performed the song in two versions, the first one being included on her first Christmas album Christmas in My Heart in 2005, the second one being part of the Christmas show in the first season of the German TV Show Sing meinen Song – Das Tauschkonzert in 2014.

On 4 November 2022, "Ring Out the Bells" was released as the album's first official single.

Critical reception

In her review for laut.de, Kerstin Kratochwill wrote that "the perfectly polished pop" on Not So Silent Night "shines like an over-decorated Christmas tree." WDR 2 critic Oliver Rustemeyer found that Not So Silent Night is "also a typical Christmas album, but it not only sounds contemplative, but also wild and at least partly rocky."

Track listing

Charts

Weekly charts

Year-end charts

Release history

References

2022 albums
2022 Christmas albums
Sarah Connor (singer) albums